Crony Pond Branch is a  long 1st order tributary to Toms Dam Branch in Sussex County, Delaware.  This is the only stream of this name in the United States.

Course
Crony Pond Branch rises in Owens, Delaware and then flows west to join Toms Dam Branch about 0.5 miles east of St. Johnstown.

Watershed
Crony Pond Branch drains  of area, receives about 45.4 in/year of precipitation, has a topographic wetness index of 677.03 and is about 9% forested.

See also
List of Delaware rivers

References

Rivers of Delaware
Rivers of Sussex County, Delaware
Tributaries of the Nanticoke River